"Beibi" is a song by Finnish pop rock band Haloo Helsinki!. In September 2014, the song peaked at number one on the Official Finnish Singles Chart, Download Chart and Airplay Chart.

Track listing

Charts

References

External links
 Official music video of "Beibi" on YouTube

2014 singles
Haloo Helsinki! songs
Finnish-language songs
Number-one singles in Finland
2014 songs